Oak Valley Township may refer to the following places in the United States:

Oak Valley Township, Elk County, Kansas
Oak Valley Township, Otter Tail County, Minnesota

Township name disambiguation pages